Field artillery may refer to:

 Field artillery, a category of mobile weapons supporting armies in the field
 Field Artillery (magazine), a discontinued bimonthly magazine published from 1911 to 2007 by the U.S. Field Artillery Association
 Field artillery team, a type of tactical organization in the U.S. Army
 Royal Field Artillery, a branch of British Army artillery, from 1899 to 1924
 United States Army Field Artillery Corps, a corps of the U.S. Army
 U.S. Field Artillery March, song by John Philip Sousa